Distribution software refers to software which manages everything from order processing and inventory control to accounting, purchasing and customer service, supply chain management, sales, customer relationship management, and finance management.

More sophisticated solutions can cover areas such as advanced forecasting and replenishment, warehouse management, pick, pack and shipping, EDI or Electronic Data Interchange, Trade Spend Management and more.

Distribution software helps companies to manage internal and external resources efficiently by minimizing stockouts but ensuring overstocking doesn't occur as well.

Cloud-based distribution software began its rise in popularity in approximately 2010.  The benefits of cloud-based distribution solutions include the ability to access the application from any device that uses a web browser and cost-savings resulting from reduced hardware requirements.

See also 
 Enterprise resource planning
 Document automation
 Inventory control system
 Operations management
 Supply chain management
 Warehouse management system

References 

Supply chain management
Business software